Jinfeng Lu Station is a station of Line 1, Suzhou Rail Transit. The station is located in Suzhou New District of Suzhou. It has been in use since April 28, 2012, the same time of the operation of Line 1.

Station

Accessible Information
 Jinfeng Lu Station is a fully accessible station, this station equipped with wheelchair accessible elevators, blind paths with bumps, and wheelchair ramps. These facilities can help people with disabilities, seniors, youths, and pregnancies travel through Suzhou Rail Transit system.

Station configurations
L1 (First Floor/Street Level): Entrances/Exits (stairs and escalators); and elevators with wheelchair accessible ramps.

B1 (Mezzanine/Station Hall Level): Station Control Room; Customer Service; Automatic Ticket Vending Machines; Automatic Fee Collection Systems with turnstiles; stairs and escalators; and elevators with wheelchair accessible ramps.

B2 (Platform Level): Platform; toilet; stairs and escalators; elevators with wheelchair accessible ramps.

Station layout

First & Last Trains

Exits Information
Exit 1: South-West Corner of Jinfeng Lu and Zhuyuan Lu

Exit 2: South-East Corner of Jinfeng Lu and Zhuyuan Lu

Exit 3: North-East Corner of Jinfeng Lu and Zhuyuan Lu

Exit 4: North-West Corner of Jinfeng Lu and Zhuyuan Lu

Local Attractions
WanFeng Garden
JinFeng International Garden
SND Water Supply Plant

Bus Connections
Bus Stop: MuDu XinQu - Connection Bus Routes: 30, 35, 69,  69 Lessened Line, 326, 400, 661

Bus Stop: XinQu ShuiChang - Connection Bus Routes: 2, 4, 30, 35, 38, 64, 400, 622, 662

Bus Stop: JinFengLu ZhuYuanLu Nan - Connection Bus Routes: 665

Bus Stop: JunHao JingMi - Connection Bus Routes: 2, 4, 38, 622

References

Railway stations in Jiangsu
Suzhou Rail Transit stations
Railway stations in China opened in 2012